Orange Hall may refer to:

in Ireland
 Orange Institution

in the United States
Orange Hall (St. Marys, Georgia), listed on the NRHP in Georgia

Architectural disambiguation pages